Arash Sultanate was a feudal fiefdom that existed between 1747-1795 in Transcaucasus. It comprised modern Aghdash, Yevlakh and Mingachevir raion of Azerbaijan.

History 
Arash as a city was founded in 15th century. It was governed within Shirvan beylarbeylik of Safavid Empire. Later it was later put under suzerainty of Shaki Khanate by Haji Chalabi Khan. It consisted of 27 settlements with ~5000 population, 19% of them being Armenian or Udi.

Sultans 

 Malik Ali  was involved in Aghakishi beg's murder in 1759. Later rebelled against Muhammad Husayn Khan Mushtaq who was his son-in-law in 1761, but put under his suzerainty with confirmation from Fatali khan Afshar. Killed shortly after that.
 Malik Ali Muhammad  son of former.
 Malik Ali Husayn
 Shabaddin Sultan  nephew of Malik Ali, rebelled against Muhammad Hasan khan, killed in 1795. After his death sultanate was abolished and absorbed into Shaki Khanate as a district.

References 

1747 establishments in Asia
1795 disestablishments in Asia
Former sultanates